Zollman or Zollmann is a German surname. Notable people with the surname include: 

Péter Zollman (1931–2013), Hungarian-born scientist, research physicist, engineer, inventor, and translator
Ronald Zollman (born 1950), Belgian conductor

See also
 Oxbow Park and Zollman Zoo

German-language surnames